The Kapp Starostin Formation is a geologic formation in Norway. The layers span around 27 million years of the Permian period; and it preserves fossils dating back to the Carboniferous period.

See also 
 List of fossiliferous stratigraphic units in Norway

References 

Geologic formations of Norway
Geology of Svalbard
Carboniferous System of Europe
Carboniferous Norway
Permian System of Europe
Permian Norway
Changhsingian